King of the Saddle is a 1926 American silent Western comedy film directed by William James Craft and starring Bill Cody, Joan Meredith  and Billy Franey.

Cast
 Bill Cody as Billy
 Joan Meredith as Mary
 Billy Franey as Nick

References

External links
 

1926 films
1926 Western (genre) films
American black-and-white films
Films directed by William James Craft
Associated Exhibitors films
Films set in Missouri
Silent American Western (genre) films
1920s English-language films
1920s American films